Jeffrey Wade Enfinger (born July 27, 1951) is an American politician who served in the Alabama Senate. First elected as a Republican in 1998, he switched to the Democratic Party two years later. In 2003, he became the Senate's majority leader. After not seeking reelection in 2006, he ran for his old seat in 2010, losing to Paul Sanford.

References

External links

1951 births
Living people
Alabama Democrats
Alabama Republicans
Alabama state senators
20th-century American politicians
21st-century American politicians